Czernin von und zu Chudenitz is a noble family originating in Bohemia.

Czernin may also refer to the following places in Poland:

Czernin, Pomeranian Voivodeship
Czernin, West Pomeranian Voivodeship